Types of Bakuvian Bazaars is a 1907 Azerbaijani short documentary film directed by Vasili Amaşukeli.

The film shot on 35mm captures the market scene in Baku, Azerbaijan in the early twentieth century.

It was produced by the Qısametralı Sənədli Filmlər and Ağ-Qara Filmlər film companies.

See also
List of Azerbaijani films: 1898-1919

1907 films
Azerbaijani black-and-white films
Azerbaijani short documentary films
Anthropology documentary films
Documentary films about historical events
Azerbaijani silent short films
Films of the Russian Empire
1900s short documentary films